Miss Padania is a beauty contest held in Northern Italy and sponsored by Lega Nord.

Winners
1997 – Paola Cantamessa
1998 – Sara Venturi
1999 – Giada Sbalbi
2000 – Gloria Anselmi
2001 – Francesca De Rose
2003 – Alice Grassi
2004 – Alice Graci
2005 – Laura Albertin
2006 – Anna Bonansea
2007 – Alessandra Piscopo
2008 – Francesca Crocini
2009 – Dora Laura Mazzei

References

Beauty pageants in Italy
Italian awards
Lega Nord